This list of U.S. counties with shortest life expectancy includes 50 counties (or county equivalents) out of a grand total of 3,142 counties or county equivalents in the United States.  With the exception of one city (Baltimore), the counties with shortest life expectancy at birth have a largely rural population. The counties listed include 24 with a population consisting of more than 50 percent of non-Hispanic whites, 18 with a population consisting of more than 50 percent of African-Americans, and 8 with a population consisting of more than 50 percent of Native Americans

The U.S. states represented on the list are Kentucky (14 counties); Mississippi (8 counties); Alabama and South Dakota (5 counties each); Arkansas, Louisiana, and West Virginia (three counties each); Missouri (2 counties), and Alaska, Florida, Maryland, Montana, North Dakota, South Carolina, and Tennessee (one county each).

The 14 counties in Kentucky on the list are located in the Eastern Kentucky Coalfield, a region with an economy formerly dominated by coal mining.  The three counties in West Virginia on the list also have economies formerly dominated by coal. The population of these counties consists largely of non-Hispanic whites.

The 8 counties on the list in Mississippi are located mostly in the Mississippi Delta, a region heavily populated by African Americans.

The 50 counties on the list have life expectancy at birth of 6 to 12 years less than the average life expectancy of all the residents of the United States.  Ten of the counties on the list, 9 of them with majority non-Hispanic white populations, experienced declines in life expectancy between 1980 and 2014.

Among all the counties in the US is a wide range in average life expectancy from birth. The residents of Summit County, Colorado live an average of 86.83 years.  The residents of Oglala Lakota County (formerly Shannon County) of South Dakota live an average of 66.81 years – twenty years less.  Moreover, the gap between the counties with the longest life expectancy and the shortest is widening.  The average life expectancy of the United States as a whole increased by more than 5 years between 1980 and 2014. The life expectancy of most of the longest-lived counties equaled or exceeded that increase.  The life expectancy of most of the shortest-lived counties increased less than 5 years – and in a few counties life expectancy decreased.

A study published in the Journal of the American Medical Association in 2016 concluded that income was a major component of the difference in life expectancy in states, counties, races, and regions of the U.S. Men in the richest one percent of the population lived 15 years longer than men in the poorest one percent of the population and women in the richest one percent of the population lived 10 years longer.

Counties with small populations (and therefore small numbers of deaths) have a larger margin of error in determining life expectancy than counties with larger populations.

List

See also

References

Counties,life expectancy,shortest
Counties,Life expectancy,shortest
Life expectancy,shortest,Counties
United States